William Pine may refer to:
William B. Pine (1877–1942), United States Senator from Oklahoma
William H. Pine (1896–1955), American film producer
William T. Pine (1873–?), American mayor of Marlborough, Massachusetts
Terry Harknett (born 1936), British author who used William Pine as a pseudonym

See also
William Pyne (disambiguation)